There is a large array of stakeholders that provide services through electricity generation, transmission, distribution and marketing for industrial, commercial, public and residential customers in the United States. It also includes many public institutions that regulate the sector.
In 1996, there were 3,195 electric utilities in the United States, of which fewer than 1,000 were engaged in power generation. This leaves a large number of mostly smaller utilities engaged only in power distribution. There were also 65 power marketers. Of all utilities, 2,020 were publicly owned (including 10 Federal utilities), 932 were rural electric cooperatives, and 243 were investor-owned utilities. The electricity transmission network is controlled by Independent System Operators or Regional Transmission Organizations, which are not-for-profit organizations that are obliged to provide indiscriminate access to various suppliers to promote competition.

The four above-mentioned market segments of the U.S. electricity sector are regulated by different public institutions with some functional overlaps: The federal government sets general policies through the Department of Energy, environmental policy through the Environmental Protection Agency and consumer protection policy through the Federal Trade Commission. The safety of nuclear power plants is overseen by the Nuclear Regulatory Commission. Economic regulation of the distribution segment is a state responsibility, usually carried out through Public Utilities Commissions; the inter-state transmission segment is regulated by the federal government through the Federal Energy Regulatory Commission.

Principal sources of US electricity in 2019 were: natural gas (38%), coal (23%), nuclear (20%), other renewables (11%), and hydro (7%). Over the decade 2004–2014, the largest increases in electrical generation came from natural gas (2014 generation was 412TWh greater than 2004), wind (increase of 168TWh) and solar (increased 18TWh). Over the same decade, annual generation from coal decreased 393TWh, and from petroleum decreased 90TWh.

In 2008 the average electricity tariff in the U.S. was 9.82¢/kWh. In 2006–2007 electricity tariffs in the U.S. were higher than in Australia, Canada, France, Sweden and Finland, but lower than in Germany, Italy, Spain, and the UK. Residential tariffs vary significantly between states from 6.7¢/kWh in West Virginia to 24.1¢/kWh in Hawaii. The average residential bill in 2007 was US$100/month. Most investments in the U.S. electricity sector are financed by private companies through debt and equity. However, some investments are indirectly financed by taxpayers through various subsidies ranging from tax incentives to subsidies for research and development, feed-in tariffs for renewable energy and support to low-income households to pay their electric bills.

Electricity consumption 

Electricity consumption data in this section is based upon data mined from US DOE Energy Information Administration/Electric Power Annual 2018 files 
In 2018 the total US consumption of electricity was 4,222.5 terawatt-hours (TWh).
Consumption was up from 2017, by 131.9TWh or +3.2%. 
This is broken down as:
 Residential customers (133.89 million) directly consumed 1,469.09TWh, or 34.74% of the total. This was up 90.5TWh (+6.5%) from 2017. An average residential customer used 914kWh/month and with the average US residential cost of $0.1287/kWh the average monthly electrical bill would be $117.67, up slightly from 2017. 
 Commercial customers (18.605 million) directly consumed 1,381.76TWh or 32.72% of the total. This was more (28.86TWh) than in 2017 with over 246 thousand new customers. An average commercial customer used 6,189kWh/month and with the average US commercial electric cost of $0.1067/kWh the average monthly electrical bill would be $660.36. 
 Industrial customers (840,321, flat with 2017) directly consumed 1000.7TWh or 23.70% of the total. This was a little more (16.4TWh) than in 2017 (+1.6%).
 Transportation customers (83) directly consumed 7.665TWh or 0.18% of the total. This was a little higher (0.14TWh) than in 2017.
 System loss throughout the total electrical grid infrastructure by direct use of the suppliers (144.1TWh) and for transmission and other system losses and for unaccounted for loads (219.2TWh) amounts to 363.3TWh or 8.6% of the total which is down by 0.4% from 2017. Thus, the US electric distribution system is 91.4% efficient and efficiency has improved slightly over the last year.

In addition from consumption from the electrical grid, the US consumers consumed an estimated additional 35.04TWh from small scale solar systems. This will be included in the per capita data below.

Consumption per person 
Electricity consumption per person (per capita) is based upon data mined from US DOE Energy Information Administration/Electric Power Annual 2020 files Population data is from Demographics of the United States. Per capita consumption in 2020 is 12316 kWh. This is down 456kWh from 2019 and down 8.2% from a decade ago and down 10.9% from its peak in 2007. The following table shows the yearly US per capita consumption by fuel source from 1999 to 2020.

The following table used the first column from the Demographics of the United States#Vital statistics table for population, and generation from Electric Power Annual. Technically this means that "consumption" includes transmission losses, etc., because the values in the table were all calculated from table ES1. Summary Statistics for the United States. Also since 2016 the small scale solar estimate is included in the solar contribution.

Gas includes natural gas and other gases.
Solar includes photovoltaics and thermal and includes small scale solar.
Misc includes misc generation, pumped storage, and net imports.
Bio Other includes waste, landfill gas, and other.
Hydro excludes pumped storage (not an energy source, used by all sources, other than hydro).
Total includes net imports and calculated small scale solar (since 2016)

Grid storage 
USA has 21.9 GW of pumped-storage hydroelectricity and 6.6 GW of grid batteries. They are around 80% effective (20% loss), so they are net consumers of electricity. Pumped storage generates around 1 TWh/month in winter, and around 2.5 TWh/month in summer, and batteries around a tenth of that.

Electricity generation 

In 2020, the pandemic year, installed electricity generation summer capacity in the United States was 1115.68 gigawatts (GW), up 16.57 GW from 2019. The main energy sources for electricity generation include

	Thermal/Fossil: 731.2 GW  down 7.93 GW (1%) from 2019
	Wind: 118.38 GW up 14 GW ( 13.5 %) from 2019
	Nuclear: 96.5 GW down 1.62 GW (1.6%) from 2019
	Hydropower: 79.92 GW up 0.15 GW (0.2%) from 2019
	Solar: 48 GW up 12.29 GW ( 32.7 %) from 2019 

Actual USA electricity generation in 2020 was 4007.14 terawatt-hours (TWh) and was down 120.72 TWh (2.9%) from 2019. The USA also imported 61.44 TWh and exported 14.14 TWh:[16] making a total of 4054.45 TWh for consumption, down 112.45 TWh (2.7%) from 2019.In 2020, for the first time, electric energy from Nuclear exceeded electric energy from Coal.
 
Electricity generation was primarily from the following sources:
	Thermal/Fossil : 2426.72 TWh, down 154.99  TWh (6.0 %) from 2019
	Nuclear: 789.88  TWh, down 19.53  TWh ( 2.4%) from 2019
	Wind:337.94 TWh, up  42.06 TWh ( 14.19%) from 2019
	Hydropower: 285.27 TWh, down 2.6 TWh (0.9%) from 2019
	Solar: 89.2 TWh up 17.26 TWh (24%) from 2019

The share of coal and nuclear in energy generation is much higher than their share in installed capacity, because coal and nuclear plants provide base load and thus are running longer hours than natural gas and petroleum plants which typically provide peak load, while wind turbines and solar plants produce electricity when they can and natural gas fills in as required to compensate.

Gas includes natural gas and other gases.
Solar includes photovoltaics and thermal.
Misc includes misc generation, pumped storage, and net imports.
Bio Other includes waste, landfill gas, and other.
Hydro excludes pumped storage (not an energy source, used by all sources, other than hydro).
Total includes net imports.
2021 data is from Electric Power Monthly and is preliminary.

The following tables summarize the electrical energy generated by fuel source for the United States. Electric Power Annualfor 2020 data and preliminary data from Electric Power Monthly for the 2021 data.

Fossil fuel 

Fossil fuelsmainly coal and natural gasremain the backbone of electricity generation in the U.S., accounting for 68% of installed generation capacity in 2010. Coal production has fallen significantly since 2007 with most of the losses being replaced by natural gas, but also a growing fraction of non-hydroelectric renewables.

In 2007 the Department of Energy estimated the planned additional capacity for 2008–12 at 92GW, most of which to be fueled by natural gas (48GW) and coal (19GW).

Nuclear power 

As of 2007 in the United States, there are 104 commercial nuclear reactors in the US, generating approximately 20% of the nation's total electric energy consumption. For many years, no new nuclear plants have been built in the US. However, since 2005 there has been a renewed interest in nuclear power in the US. This has been facilitated in part by the federal government with the Nuclear Power 2010 Program of 2002. and the Energy Policy Act. As of March 9, 2009, the U.S. Nuclear Regulatory Commission had received applications for permission to construct 26 new nuclear power reactors However, as of 2013 most of the new applications had been abandoned due to the low cost of electricity generated with natural gas which had become available at cheap prices due to the boom in hydraulic fracturing; electricity produced using natural gas being 4 cents per kilowatt-hour versus 10 cents, or more, for nuclear.

Renewable energy 

The following table summarizes the electrical energy generated by renewable fuel sources for the US. Data was obtained from Electric Power Monthly.

Note: Biomass includes wood and wood derived fuel, landfill gas, biogenic municipal solid waste and other waste biomass.

The development of renewable energy and energy efficiency marks "a new era of energy exploration" in the United States, according to President Barack Obama. In a joint address to the Congress on February 24, 2009, President Obama called for doubling renewable energy within the next three years. From the end of 2008 to the end of 2011 renewable energy increased by 35% and from the end of 2008 till the end of 2014, 41.4%.  In reality it took twelve years instead of three to double as 2020 saw a 100% increase from 2008.

Renewable energy accounted for more than 19.5 percent of the domestically-produced electric energy used in the United States in 2020, up from 9.25% in 2008. In the past ten years, wind production has increased by 257% (3.57×) and now provides over 8.3% of US electric requirements. 
Over this same time period solar has increased by 7200% (73×) and now provides 2.2% of US electric energy needs.

According to a report by the Interior Department, U.S. wind power – including off-shore turbines – could more than meet U.S. electricity needs. The Department of Energy has said wind power could generate 20% of US electricity by 2030.

Several solar thermal power stations, including the new 64MW Nevada Solar One, have also been built. The largest of these solar thermal power stations is the SEGS group of plants in the Mojave Desert with a total generating capacity of 354 MW, making the system the largest solar plant of any kind in the world.

Energy efficiency and conservation 

The federal government promotes energy efficiency through the Energy Star program. The Alliance to Save Energy, an industry group, also promotes energy efficiency.

Responsibilities in the electricity sector

Policy and regulation 

Policy for the electricity sector in the United States is set by the executive and legislative bodies of the federal government and state governments. Within the executive branch of the federal government the Department of Energy plays a key role. In addition, the Environmental Protection Agency is in charge of environmental regulation and the Federal Trade Commission is in charge of consumer protection and the prevention of anti-competitive practices.

Key federal legislation related to the electricity sector includes:
 the Federal Power Act of 1935 that promoted hydropower and increased the role of the federal government in the sector,
 the National Energy Act of 1978, including the Public Utility Regulatory Policies Act (PURPA), which required utilities to provide residential consumers with energy conservation audits and other services to encourage slower growth of electricity demand, and was intended to promote renewable energy with the result of promoting mainly co-generation;
 the Energy Policy Act of 1992 which provided further incentives for energy efficiency and removed obstacles to wholesale competition; and
 the Energy Independence and Security Act of 2007 which phased out incandescent light bulbs.

Many state governments have been active in promoting renewable energy. For example, in 2007 25 states and the District of Columbia had established renewable portfolio standards (RPS). There is no federal policy on RPS.

The Federal Energy Regulatory Commission is in charge of regulating interstate electricity sales, wholesale electric rates, and licensing hydropower plants. Rates for electricity distribution are regulated by state-level Public Utilities Commissions or Public Services Commissions.

Deregulation and competition 

Deregulation of the electricity sector consists in the introduction of competition and the unbundling of vertically integrated utilities in separate entities in charge of electricity generation, electricity transmission, electricity distribution and commercialization. The deregulation of the electricity sector in the U.S. began with the Energy Policy Act of 1992 which removed obstacles for wholesale competition. In practice, however, regulation has been unevenly introduced between states. It began in earnest only from 1996 onwards when the Federal Energy Regulatory Commission issued orders that required utilities to provide transmission services "on a reasonable and non-discriminatory basis". In some states, such as in California, private utilities were required to sell some of their power plants to prevent concentration of market power.

As of April 2014, 16 U.S. states – Connecticut, Delaware, Illinois, Maine, Maryland, Massachusetts, Michigan, Montana, New Hampshire, New Jersey, New York, Ohio, Oregon, Pennsylvania, Rhode Island, and Texas – 
and the District of Columbia have deregulated their electricity markets in some capacity. Additionally, seven states – Arizona, Arkansas, California, Nevada, New Mexico, Virginia, and Wyoming – started electricity deregulation in some capacity but have since suspended deregulation. 
The deregulation of the Texas electricity market in 2002 is one of the better-known examples. The result has been that the different states with in United States have a wide spectrum of different levels of deregulation. Some states only allow large commercial customers to choose a different supplier, some allow all consumers to choose. Contrary to the largely similar methods of deregulation for natural gas, different states have taken very different approaches to electricity deregulation.

Service provision 

Electric utilities in the U.S. can be both in charge of electricity generation and electricity distribution. The electricity transmission network is not owned by individual utilities, but by companies and organizations that are obliged to provide indiscriminate access to various suppliers to promote competition. In 1996, there were 3,195 electric utilities in the United States and 65 power marketers. Of these, 2,020 were publicly owned (including 10 Federal utilities), 932 were rural electric cooperatives, and 243 were investor-owned utilities. Fewer than 1,000 utilities are engaged in power generation.

Generation 

About 80% of the electricity in the U.S. is generated by private ("investor-owned") utilities. The remaining electricity is produced by the public sector. This includes federal agencies such as the Tennessee Valley Authority (producing mainly nuclear and hydropower), and Power Marketing Administrations of the Department of Energy, one of which is the Bonneville Power Administration (in the Pacific Northwest)(hydropower). It also includes municipal utilities and utility cooperatives.

The largest private electric producers in the United States include:

 AES Corporation
 Southern Company, 42GW
 American Electric Power, 38GW
 Duke Energy, 58.2GW
 Luminant, 18GW
 Reliant Energy, 14GW
 Pacific Gas and Electric Company, 7.7GW
 Allegheny Energy

Transmission 

There are two major wide area synchronous grids in North America, the Eastern Interconnection and the Western Interconnection. Besides this there are two minor power grids in the U.S., the Alaska Interconnection and the Texas Interconnection. The Eastern, Western and Texas Interconnections are tied together at various points with DC interconnects allowing electrical power to be transmitted throughout the contiguous U.S., parts of Canada and parts of Mexico. The transmission grids are operated by transmission system operators (TSOs), not-for profit companies that are typically owned by the utilities in their respective service area, where they coordinate, control and monitor the operation of the electrical power system. TSOs are obliged to provide non-discriminatory transmission access to electricity generators and customers. TSOs can be of two types: Independent System Operators (ISOs) and Regional Transmission Organizations (RTOs). The former operates within a single state and the latter covers wider areas crossing state borders.

In 2009 there were four RTOs in the U.S.:

 ISO New England (ISO-NE, which is an RTO despite its name);
 Midcontinent Independent System Operator;
 PJM Interconnection in the Mid-Atlantic region; and
 Southwest Power Pool (SPP) covering Oklahoma, Kansas and parts of Arkansas, Missouri, Texas and New Mexico.

There are also three ISOs:

 California Independent System Operator (California ISO);
 New York Independent System Operator (NYISO);
 Electric Reliability Council of Texas (ERCOT, an ISO).

RTOs are similar, but not identical to the nine Regional Reliability Councils associated in the North American Electric Reliability Corporation (NERC), a non-profit entity that is in charge of improving the reliability and security of the bulk power system in the U.S., Canada and the northern part of Baja California in Mexico. The members of the Regional Reliability Councils include private, public and cooperative utilities, power marketers and final customers. The Regional Reliability Councils are:

 Eastern Interconnection
 Florida Reliability Coordinating Council (FRCC)
 Midwest Reliability Organization (MRO)
 Northeast Power Coordinating Council (NPCC)
 ReliabilityFirst Corporation (RFC)
 SERC Reliability Corporation (SERC)
 Southwest Power Pool (SPP)
 Western Interconnection
 Western Electricity Coordinating Council (WECC)
 Texas Interconnection
 Electric Reliability Council of Texas (ERCOT)

The FERC distinguishes between 10 power markets in the U.S., including the seven for which RTOs have been established, well as:

 Northwest
 Southwest (covering Arizona, most of New Mexico and Colorado)
 Southeast

ISOs and RTOs were established in the 1990s when states and regions established wholesale competition for electricity.

Distribution 

About 75% of electricity sales to final customers are undertaken by private utilities, with the remainder being sold by municipal utilities and cooperatives.

Economic and financial aspects

Tariffs and affordability 

In 2008 the average electricity tariff in the U.S. was 9.82¢/kWh, up from 6.9¢/kWh in 1995. Residential tariffs were somewhat higher at 11.36¢/kWh, while commercial tariffs stood at 10.28¢/kWh and industrial tariffs at 7.01¢/kWh. The cost of supplying high-voltage power to high-volume industrial customers is lower than the cost of providing low-voltage (120V) power to residential and commercial customers.

In 2006–07 commercial electricity tariffs in the U.S. (9.28¢/kWh) were higher than in Australia (7.1¢/kWh), Canada (6.18¢/kWh) that relies mainly on hydropower or in France (8.54¢/kWh) that relies heavily on nuclear power, but lower than in Germany (13.16¢/kWh), Italy (15.74¢/kWh) or the UK (11.16¢/kWh) that all rely to a larger degree on fossil fuels, all compared at purchasing power parity.

Residential tariffs vary significantly between states from 6.7¢/kWh in West Virginia to 24.1¢/kWh in Hawaii. An important factor that influences tariff levels is the mix of energy sources used in power generation. For example, access to cheap federal power from hydropower plants contributes to low electricity tariffs in some states.

Average residential electricity consumption in the U.S. was 936kWh/month per in 2007, and the average bill was US$100/month. Average residential consumption varies considerably between states from 530kWh/month in Maine to 1,344kWh/month in Tennessee. Factors that influence residential energy consumption are climate, tariffs and efforts to promote energy conservation.

Revenues 

Total revenue from the sale of electricity in 2008 was US$344bn, including US$148bn from residential customers, US$129bn from commercial customers and US$66bn from industrial customers. Many large industries self-generate electricity and their electricity consumption thus is not included in these figures.

Investment

Financing 

Most investments in the U.S. electricity sector are financed by private companies through debt and equity. However, some investments are indirectly financed by taxpayers through various subsidies.

Subsidies and tax incentives 
There is a large array of subsidies in the U.S. electricity sector ranging from various forms of tax incentives to subsidies for research and development, feed-in tariffs for renewable energy and support to low-income households to pay their electric bills. Some subsidies are available throughout the U.S., while others are only available in some states.

Tax incentives include federal and state tax deductions and tax breaks. Tax incentives can be directed at consumers, such as for the purchase of energy-efficient appliances or for solar energy systems, small wind systems, geothermal heat pumps, and residential fuel cell and microturbine systems. Tax incentives can also be directed at electricity producers, in particular for renewable energy.

The Low Income Home Energy Assistance Program (LIHEAP) received federal funding of $5.1 billion in Fiscal Year 2009. It is funded mainly by the federal government through the U.S. Department of Health and Human Services, Administration for Children and Families, and is administered by states and territories. While some of its funding is for fuel for heating, some is also used to cover electricity bills for both heating and cooling.

In April 2009, 11 U.S. state legislatures were considering adopting feed-in tariffs as a complement to their renewable electricity mandates.

See also 
 Energy in the United States
 Energy policy of the United States
 2000–01 California electricity crisis
 Northeast blackout of 2003
 Energy Information Administration
 List of largest power stations in the United States
 List of U.S. states by electricity production from renewable sources

References

External links 
 U.S. Department of Energy (DoE)
 Energy Information Administration